Illusion is the seventh studio album from Spoken. E1 Music released the album on February 12, 2013. Spoken worked with Jasen Rauch, on the production of this album.

Critical reception

Awarding the album three and a half stars for Alternative Press, Jason Schreurs writes, "a super-solid riff-rock album". Dan MacIntosh, giving the album three and a half stars at HM Magazine, states, "Spoken has come back with fists a flying, with plenty of sonic firepower still at its disposal." Rating the album three stars from CCM Magazine, Matt Conner says, "Spoken is prepped for a strong re-entry into the market". Wayne Myatt, signaling in a four star review from Jesus Freak Hideout, describes, "Spoken has made a remarkable return with an achievement that surpasses all of their preceding efforts." Indicating in a four star review at Jesus Freak Hideout, Michael Weaver responds, "While their self-titled was a bit of a disappointment, especially with Baird's weakest vocal attempt, Illusion is far from a let-down." Assigning a five star review on the album for Indie Vision Music, Lee Brown replies, "Spoken returns with a powerful and nearly flawless album that is beautifully aggressive and powerfully tender as it balances two distinct sounds that few other bands could blend so masterfully together on one album."

Track listing

Chart performance

References

2013 albums
Spoken (band) albums